Toni Šparada (born 25 August 2000) is a Croatian professional water polo player. He is currently playing for VK Solaris. He is 6 ft 3 in (1.90 m) tall and weighs 201 lb (91 kg). His brother, Marin Šparada, is also water polo player.

References 

Living people
2000 births
Croatian male water polo players